William Leslie Murphy (April 7, 1914 – January 15, 1985) was an American football guard. A native of Owensboro, Kentucky, he attended high school in Mount Carmel, Illinois, and played college football at Washington University in St. Louis. He then played professional football in the National Football League (NFL) for the Chicago Cardinals during the 1940 and 1941 seasons. He appeared in 12 NFL games. In 1942, he was hired as the line coach at Washington University.

References

1914 births
1985 deaths
American football guards
Chicago Cardinals players
Washington University Bears football coaches
Washington University Bears football players
People from Mount Carmel, Illinois
Sportspeople from Owensboro, Kentucky
Coaches of American football from Illinois
Players of American football from Illinois